Ischnophylla is a genus of moths in the family Gelechiidae. It contains the species Ischnophylla similicolor, which is found in South Africa.

References

Endemic moths of South Africa
Apatetrinae